Enoch Robert Gibbon Salisbury (7 November 1819 – 1890) was a Welsh barrister, author and politician.

Life
The eldest son of Joseph Salisbury of Bagillt, Flintshire, he became a student of the Inner Temple, 7 January 1850, and was called to the bar on 17 November 1852. He went on the North Wales circuit, where he had a good practice, but his main success was as a parliamentary counsel. He was elected in the Liberal interest Member of Parliament for Chester in 1857, but was unsuccessful in contesting the seat in 1859.

Salisbury collected books relating to Wales and the border counties, and his library went to the University College of South Wales and Monmouthshire by purchase, in 1886. He died at his house, Glen-aber, Saltney, near Chester, on 27 October 1890, and was buried at Eccleston, Cheshire.

Works
Salisbury published:

 A Letter on National Education, suggested by "A Letter on State Education in Wales", 1849.
 A Catalogue of Cambrian Books at Glen-aber, Chester, 1500–1799, not mentioned in Rowlands's Cambrian Bibliography, Carnarvon, 1874.
 Border Counties Literature, a Catalogue of Border County Books in the Glen-aber Library, Chester, A.D. 1500–1882, pt. i. Chester, no date. 
 Border Counties' Worthies (reprinted from the Oswestry Advertiser), 1st and 2nd ser. London, 1880.

Family
Salisbury married, on 28 June 1842, Sarah, youngest daughter of the Rev. Arthur Jones, D.D. She died on 2 March 1879, leaving a son and five daughters.

References

Attribution

External links
Enoch Salisbury's archive and personal library is held in Special Collections and Archives, Cardiff University.

1819 births
1890 deaths
Welsh barristers
19th-century Welsh writers
Members of the Parliament of the United Kingdom for English constituencies
UK MPs 1857–1859
Liberal Party (UK) MPs for English constituencies
Members of the Inner Temple
Welsh book and manuscript collectors